For information on all Texas A&M University–Commerce sports, see Texas A&M–Commerce Lions
The Texas A&M–Commerce Lions women's volleyball team (formerly the East Texas State Lions) is the women's intercollegiate volleyball program representing Texas A&M University–Commerce. The school competes in the Southland Conference (SLC) in Division I of the National Collegiate Athletic Association (NCAA). For the first 44 years of existence, they competed in the Lone Star Conference of Division II. The A&M–Commerce women's volleyball team plays its home games at the University Field House on the university campus in Commerce, Texas. The Lions have won two conference regular-season titles, an LSC tournament championship, and have appeared in the NCAA tournament on five occasions, three times during the tenure of head coach Kathy Goodlett (1983–89) and two under Craig Case. Beginning in 2023, the team will be coached by Joe Morales.

History 

Women's volleyball has been a varsity sport at A&M–Commerce (then East Texas State) since 1978, and the team has played in the LSC since it began sponsoring the sport in 1983. In 1980, the Lions finished the season as the National Association of Intercollegiate Athletics (NAIA) national runners-up. From its inception until 1982, the program competed in the NAIA under head coach Donna Tavener; that year, it began competing at the NCAA Division II level.

The Lions were one of the strongest teams in the LSC during the 1980s, never finishing below fourth place in the conference under the guidance of head coach Kathy Goodlett between 1983 and 1989, and winning the conference regular-season title in 1986 and 1987 as well as the LSC tournament in 1986. The team also reached the NCAA Division II tournament quarterfinals in 1987, and advanced to the second round of the national tournament in the two subsequent seasons, 1987 and 1988.

Since the end of Goodlett's coaching tenure in 1989, the A&M–Commerce women's volleyball program has failed to win a regular-season conference championship. From 1990 to 2022, the Lions have been coached by Terri Johnson (1990–95), Larry Blackwell (1996–2002), Gwen Weatherford (2003–07), Mark Pryor (2008–09), and Craig Case (2010–2022). Case would lead the Lions to a Lone Star Conference championship in 2018. Case also guided the Lions to NCAA Tournament appearances in both 2017 and 2018. On February 3, 2021, Case became the winningest coach in program history, earning his 186th victory.

During their first Division I season, the Lions endured their first losing season since 2014, going 11-23 overall and 6-12 in conference play. Despite this, the Lions still managed to qualify for the Southland Conference Tournament with a seventh place finish. There, they would defeat the New Orleans Privateers in the first round before falling to the McNeese State Cowgirls in the quarterfinal round.

After the season, Case stepped down after 13 seasons as the Lions' head coach on December 5, 2022. Joe Morales was hired as the program's eighth head coach on January 19, 2023.

All-time record 

Year-by-year results through the end of the 2022 season

Arena 

The Lions women's volleyball program has played at the University Field House since the inception of the program in 1978, although the arena itself was built in 1950 and dedicated in January 1951 as the home of the school's men's basketball program. The Field House has a capacity of 5,000 for both volleyball and basketball contests. The arena has also been the host to numerous athletic camps and concerts.

Designed by George Dahl, the Field House was intended to resemble an airplane hangar, with an arched roof topping out at  that is supported by steel beams. In 1949, school president James Gee announced plans for the building's construction along with Memorial Stadium at a combined cost of $325,000. Since its opening in 1951, the Field House has been renovated on numerous occasions: in 1969 (adding classrooms, offices, and dressing rooms), 1991 (replacing bleachers, hardwood playing surface, the HVAC system, and scoreboards), and 2014 (again replacing the playing surface).

Notes

References

External links